Hardwick is a census-designated place (CDP) in Kings County, California, United States. It is part of the Hanford–Corcoran Metropolitan Statistical Area. The population was 138 at the 2010 Census.

Hardwick is in the San Joaquin Valley on Excelsior Avenue between 14th and 15th Avenues. Its ZIP Code is 93230 and the community is inside area code 559.

The Kings County Fire Department operates a fire station in Hardwick.

The community is located in the Kings River-Hardwick School District.

History
Hardwick was named to commemorate an official of the Southern Pacific Railroad.

A post office was established in Hardwick in 1895, discontinued in 1904, reestablished in 1909, and finally permanently closed in 1942. Subsequently, the community has been served by the post office located in Hanford.

The first school in the community was moved from the then-fading town of Kingston. Another schoolhouse was reportedly built in 1893. Subsequently, a new school was constructed in 1914 and operated until the Hardwick and Kings River schools unified in 1962. The present fire station is located on the site of that school.

Demographics

The 2010 United States Census reported that Hardwick had a population of 138. The racial makeup of Hardwick was 63 (45.7%) White, 5 (3.6%) African American, 0 (0.0%) Native American, 0 (0.0%) Asian, 0 (0.0%) Pacific Islander, 67 (48.6%) from other races, and 3 (2.2%) from two or more races. Hispanic or Latino of any race were 86 persons (62.3%).

The Census reported that 137 people (99.3% of the population) lived in households, 1 (0.7%) lived in non-institutionalized group quarters, and 0 (0%) were institutionalized.

There were 34 households, out of which 20 (58.8%) had children under the age of 18 living in them, 21 (61.8%) were opposite-sex married couples living together, 2 (5.9%) had a female householder with no husband present, 4 (11.8%) had a male householder with no wife present. There were 4 (11.8%) unmarried opposite-sex partnerships, and 1 (2.9%) same-sex married couples or partnerships. 6 households (17.6%) were made up of individuals, and 3 (8.8%) had someone living alone who was 65 years of age or older. The average household size was 4.03. There were 27 families (79.4% of all households); the average family size was 4.56.

The population was spread out, with 52 people (37.7%) under the age of 18, 16 people (11.6%) aged 18 to 24, 29 people (21.0%) aged 25 to 44, 27 people (19.6%) aged 45 to 64, and 14 people (10.1%) who were 65 years of age or older. The median age was 25.5 years. For every 100 females, there were 112.3 males. For every 100 females age 18 and over, there were 115.0 males.

The homeowner vacancy rate was 0%; the rental vacancy rate was 5.9%. 63 people (45.7% of the population) lived in owner-occupied housing units and 74 people (53.6%) lived in rental housing units.

References

External links
Kings River-Hardwick School District

Census-designated places in Kings County, California
Census-designated places in California